Clarksdale-Jerome Elementary School District 3  is a public school district based in Yavapai County, Arizona, United States.

External links
 

School districts in Yavapai County, Arizona